The women's 3 km individual pursuit competition at the 1998 Asian Games was held on 14 and 15 December at Huamark Velodrome.

Schedule
All times are Indochina Time (UTC+07:00)

Results

Qualification

Semifinals

Heat 1

Heat 2

Finals

Bronze

Gold

References

External links 
Results

Track Women individual pursuit